Prick may refer to:

 Prick (manufacturing), a style of marking tool
 Goad or prick, a traditional farming implement
 Fingerprick, a wound for blood sample
 Prick (slang), vulgar slang for human penis or a derogatory term for a male
 Prick (magazine), a free tattoo and piercing monthly in Atlanta, Georgia, US

Music
 Prick (band)
 Prick (Prick album)
 Prick (Melvins album)
 "Prick", a song by Something for Kate

People with the surname
 Christof Prick, (born 1946), German orchestra conductor

See also 
 Kicking Against the Pricks, a Nick Cave and the Bad Seeds album
 Lilly Wood and the Prick, a French musical band
 Pricking the Lites, a ceremony used for appointing English sheriffs
 Prickle (disambiguation)